Smalls Falls, a waterfall in Maine, is a series of waterfalls and cascades on the Sandy River in Township E, West Central Franklin, Maine, in the United States. It totals  in height, and consists of (from top to bottom) a 12-foot slide/horsetail, a 25-foot segmented waterfall, a 14-foot horsetail, and a 3-foot cascade, separated by pools. A rest area on Maine Route 4 provides access to the falls; the rest area includes pit toilets, parking and picnic tables.

Notes

External links 

 Maine Geological Survey, "Some Geological Features at Smalls Falls". Retrieved May 27, 2010.

Waterfalls of Maine
Landforms of Franklin County, Maine
Tourist attractions in Franklin County, Maine
Tiered waterfalls